Glipostenoda matsushitai is a species of beetle in the genus Glipostenoda. It was described in 1954.

References

matsushitai
Beetles described in 1954